Dhurringile is a small town in Victoria, Australia. 10 km north of Murchison and approximately the same distance east of the Waranga Basin reservoir. It is located in the City of Greater Shepparton.

The historic Dhurringile mansion (now part of HM Prison Dhurringile) is located in the town.  Dhurringile was the name of a 65 room mansion built in 1875 by James Winter, a wealthy squatter. The name is thought to have an Aboriginal origin meaning emu’s back, which the hill on which the mansion is built is said to resemble.

References

External links

Towns in Victoria (Australia)
City of Greater Shepparton